The Court of Final Appeal of Macau is the court with the final adjudication power on laws of Macau. Prior to 1999, the highest court was the Higher Court of Justice of Macau and prior to that the Court of Appeal of the Judiciary District of Lisbon in Portugal.

Under the Basic Law of Macau, which is the constitutional document of the region, Macau remains the previous legal jurisdiction. On the other hand, the power of interpretation of the Basic Law itself, being part of the national law, is vested in the Standing Committee of the National People's Congress of China (NPCSC) in accordance with the Basic Law. However, the same Article delegates such power to the courts of Macau for interpretation while handling court cases.

Judges
Judges of the court include the following:

 Sam Hou Fai – President of the Court of Final Appeal of Macau
 Viriato Manuel Pinheiro de Lima
 Song Man Lei

See also 
 Legal system of Macau

References

External links 
 Tribunais da RAEM

Politics of Macau
Macau law
Judiciary of Macau
Macau
1999 establishments in Macau
Courts and tribunals established in 1999